Paul Cristian Mateciuc (born 28 May 1995) is a Romanian professional footballer who plays as a defender for Bucovina Rădăuți. Mateciuc made his Liga I debut on 27 May 2015 for Ceahlăul Piatra Neamț in a 0-2 defeat against Universitatea Cluj. He also played for teams such as: FC Zalău or Știința Miroslava.

References

External links
 
 

1995 births
Living people
Sportspeople from Suceava
Romanian footballers
Association football defenders
Liga I players
CSM Ceahlăul Piatra Neamț players
Liga II players
ACS Foresta Suceava players
CS Știința Miroslava players
FC Zalău players